The Varna International Ballet Competition is a biennial ballet competition held in Varna, Bulgaria. The competition was founded in 1964 and subsequently held in 1965 and 1966, and then every two years starting in 1968. Many dancers have gained their first international recognition at the competition.

Since the contest is a fierce one lasting half a month, the Varna International Ballet Competition has been called the "olympics of dance".

Winners 
 1964 : Vladimir Vasiliev, Grand Prix of Varna; Alla Sizova, Ekaterina Maximova, Vera Kirova, Sergei Vikulov, and Nikita Dolgushin (all gold medal)
 1965 : Loipa Araújo (gold medal)
 1966 : Aurora Bosh (gold medal), Martine van Hamel (distinction, junior division), Mikhail Baryshnikov (first place, junior division) 
 1968 : Marta García (first place, junior division), Rita Poelvoorde (silver medal)
 1970 : Eva Evdokimova (gold medal), Rosario Suárez (first place, junior division)
 1972 : Lyubov Gershunova
 1974 : Fernando Bujones (gold medal), Yoko Morishita (gold medal), Tatyana Kapustina (bronze medal)
 1976 : Patrick Dupond (Special Prize of the Youth Organization of Varna, junior division)
 1978 : Élisabeth Platel (silver medal) // René de Cárdenas (best duo, junior division)
 1980 : Evelyn Hart (gold medal) and David Peregrine (bronze medal) // Karin Averty (Special Prize of the Youth Organization of Varna, junior division)
 1983 : Sylvie Guillem (Special Prize of the Youth Organization of Varna, junior division)
 1984 : Manuel Legris
 1988 : Virginie Kempf (gold medal)
 1992 : Aurélie Dupont, José Carlos Martinez, (gold medals), Zenaida Yanowsky (silver medal), Yury Yanowsky//Bernard Courtot de Bouteillier, Molly Smolen//Delphine Baey (bronze medals)), Molly Smolen (Prix de Nina Ricci)
 1994 : Clairemarie Osta (silver medal), Laetitia Pujol (silver medal)
 1996 : Rasta Thomas (first place, junior)
 1998 : Zhu Yan (gold Medal) // Chi Cao (gold medal)
 2000 : Lali Kandelaki, Xiao Feng Fan, Shen Yi Sun (gold medal, seniors) 
 2002 : Hélène Bouchet (silver Medal)
 2004 : Daniil Simkin (gold medal, junior), Yum Yunesava (first place junior), Arman Grigoryan (gold medal, senior), Mathilde Froustey (gold medal, senior)
 2006 : Aubert Vanderlinden, Ivan Vasiliev (special prize, junior division)
 2012 : Brooklyn Mack (gold medal) // Denis Cherevichko (gold medal)
 2014 : Soo Bin Lee (special distinction), Sara Renda (bronze medal), Ralitsa Ilieva (bronze medal)
2016 : Amanda Gomes (gold medal) // Paul Marque (gold medal)
2018 : António Casalinho (first place, juniors), Siyi Li (first place, girls), Yuan Zhe Zi Huan (gold medal，women), Katherine Barkman (silver medal), Sinuo Chang (gold medal, men)

References

External links
 The World Famous Stars of IBC – Varna

External links 
 Varna International Ballet Competition

Ballet competitions
Culture in Varna, Bulgaria
1964 establishments in Bulgaria
Biennial events
Competitions in Bulgaria
Recurring events established in 1964